is a professional Australian rules footballer playing for the Gold Coast Football Club in the Australian Football League (AFL).

Early life
Davies was raised in Cairns, Queensland by his Japanese mother and Tasmanian-born father. He grew up playing Australian rules football for the Manunda Hawks and basketball for the Cairns Marlins, where he was considered an outstanding junior prospect in both sports. At the age of 12, he was placed in the Gold Coast Suns' developmental academy as well as being placed in the Cairns Taipans' academy program as a teenager. In 2017, Davies captained Queensland to an Under-16 Junior National Basketball Championship victory which led to selection for his home state at the 2018 Basketball Australia Under-18 National Championships. He also represented Queensland at the 2018 AFL Under-16 National Championships and was named in the All-Australian team for his impressive performances.

Davies attended Cairns State High School with fellow football and basketball prodigy Tamuri Wigness throughout most of their teenage years and both juniors were given the opportunity to pursue professional careers in either sport. Wigness elected to continue with basketball in Cairns while Davies relocated to the Gold Coast towards the end of 2018 to join the Gold Coast Suns' academy program on a full-time basis as well as complete his schooling at All Saints Anglican School. The pair remain close friends and often train together in both sports when based in the same area.

In his first year based on the Gold Coast, Davies was influential for the Suns in their 2019 Northern Academy Series win and was rewarded with selection for the Allies at the 2019 AFL Under 18 Championships as a bottom ager. He made his senior QAFL for Broadbeach in June 2019, where he received his senior jumper from his Japanese grandfather, and caught the eye of coach Beau Zorko in his sole appearance for the club that year. Davies finished the year by competing in the Under-17 AFL Future All Stars game where he impressed with 18 disposals and a goal. Leading into his draft year, he was considered a top 10 draft prospect and was compared to Scott Pendlebury with his basketball background and ability to play as a tall midfielder but 2020 proved to be an injury plagued year for him. Despite the interrupted season, Davies was pre-listed by the Gold Coast Suns on the eve of the 2020 AFL draft.

AFL career
Davies joined Gold Coast for his first AFL preseason in December 2020. He made his AFL debut for the Suns at 19 years of age in round 23 of the 2021 AFL season.

Statistics
 Statistics are correct to the end of round 2, 2022

|-
|- style="background-color: #EAEAEA"
! scope="row" style="text-align:center" | 2021
|style="text-align:center;"|
| 30 || 1 || 0 || 2 || 5 || 11 || 16 || 2 || 6 || 0.0 || 2.0 || 5.0 || 11.0 || 16.0 || 2.0 || 6.0
|-
! scope="row" style="text-align:center" | 2022
|style="text-align:center;"|
| 5 || 2 || 2 || 0 || 13 || 9 || 22 || 3 || 8 || 1.0 || 0.0 || 6.5 || 4.5 || 11.0 || 1.5 || 4.0
|-
|- class="sortbottom"
! colspan=3| Career
! 3
! 2
! 2
! 18
! 20
! 38
! 5
! 14
! 0.7
! 0.7
! 6.0
! 6.7
! 12.7
! 1.7
! 4.7
|}

References

External links

2002 births
Living people
Gold Coast Football Club players
Australian rules footballers from Queensland
Sportspeople from Cairns
Australian people of Japanese descent